, born April 25, 1947, as  is a former sumo wrestler from Hokkaidō, Japan. His highest rank was ōzeki. After his retirement he set up Ōshima stable which he ran from 1980 until he left the Japan Sumo Association in 2012 upon reaching the age of 65.

Career
Born in Aibetsu, Kamikawa District, Asahikuni made his professional debut in July 1963, joining Tatsunami stable. He reached the second highest jūryō division in March 1969 and the top makuuchi division just two tournaments after that. In 1970 he dropped to jūryō once again but he returned to the top division in 1972, reaching sekiwake in November.
 
At the beginning of 1976 Asahikuni put together two strong records of 12–3 and 13-2, finishing as runner-up in both tournaments, and this earned him promotion to the rank of ōzeki. It had taken him 77 tournaments from his professional debut to reach ōzeki, which at the time was the slowest ever. His best tournament result came in July 1977 when he lost just one bout, but he finished as runner-up to Kitanoumi who won with a perfect record. Asahikuni was never able to win a top division championship, this being his fourth and final runner-up performance.

He retired in September 1979 after 21 tournaments as an ōzeki. His retirement was enforced, as he had broken his shoulder in a bout with Mienoumi. The two wrestlers had been friends as well as rivals, having made their professional debuts in the same month, and their friendship survived the incident.

Fighting style
Asahikuni was an extremely skilful wrestler, earning the nickname "the PhD of sumo", such was his knowledge of a wide variety of techniques. He won the prestigious Ginō-shō, or Technique prize, on six occasions. He achieved this despite the fact that he suffered regularly from pancreatitis and was known even to commute to tournaments from hospital. He specialised in a left hand outside, right hand inside grip on his opponent's mawashi, migi-yotsu, from which he regularly won by shitatenage, or underarm throw. He was also one of very few wrestlers to use tottari, or arm pull.

Retirement from sumo
Asahikuni stayed in the sumo world as an elder at Tatsunami stable under the name of Ōshima Oyakata. In 1980 he established Ōshima stable, despite strong opposition from his old stable boss Tatsunami, who did not want him to break away from the stable even though Asahikuni did not take any high ranking wrestlers with him. Ōshima stable eventually produced Asahifuji, and when he was promoted to ōzeki in 1987 Ōshima exchanged some words with his former stablemaster for the first time since he left Tatsunami stable seven years previously. Asahifuji went on to reach the yokozuna rank in 1990. 

In 1992 Ōshima became the first stablemaster to recruit Mongolians, with six joining for the March 1992 tournament. Two of them, Kyokushūzan and Kyokutenhō, reached the top division, rising to komusubi and sekiwake respectively. In all Ōshima produced ten sekitori, including komusubi Kyokudōzan and Asahiyutaka. He also worked as a judge of tournament bouts and was on the Japan Sumo Association's board of directors until 2010 when he lost an election to Takanohana. Upon reaching the mandatory retirement age of 65 in April 2012 Ōshima stable was dissolved with its wrestlers moving to Tomozuna stable. Kyokutenhō, who had once been considered a future head of Ōshima stable, instead became head of Tomozuna stable in 2017.

Family
Asahikuni has two sons, both of whom joined his stable, but neither reached the elite sekitori ranks. His eldest, Tomō, born in 1978, joined in 1994 and was known as Kyokuhoten. He retired in November 1999 after a long injury layoff, with a highest rank of sandanme 26.  His younger son Kunihiro, born in 1979, made his debut in 1995 and fought under the similar ring name of Kyokushoten. He had a much longer and marginally more successful career, reaching a highest rank of makushita 46 before retiring in January 2011.

Career record

See also
Glossary of sumo terms
List of sumo tournament top division runners-up
List of sumo tournament second division champions
List of past sumo wrestlers
List of ōzeki

References

External links
 Oshima beya guide

1947 births
Living people
Japanese sumo wrestlers
Ōzeki
Sumo people from Hokkaido